Grier School (also known as The Grier School for Girls) is an independent all-girls college-preparatory boarding school in Tyrone, Pennsylvania in the United States. The school is located near the Pennsylvania State University, in the heart of the Appalachian Mountains and currently enrolls 296 students in grades 7 to 12.

Admissions 
Grier School hosts international students from more than 30 different countries each year. Grier offers ESL support classes during the school year. Before starting school, many international students must participate in the eight-week Summer TOEFL/SAT Program as preparation for school.

Curriculum 
Grier offers 21 AP classes in core disciplines.

Extracurricular activities

Athletics
Grier requires students to participate in seasonal sports and offers a wide variety each term. Grier has an equestrian team as well as volleyball, basketball, cross country, soccer, dance, fencing and tennis teams. Grier has a dance program housed in a Performing Arts Center. Grier's Pre-Professional Dancers performed at Steps on Broadway in New York City and the Koresh Showcase in Philadelphia. Non-varsity sports include alpine skiing, yoga, body sculpting, Pilates, archery, fencing, badminton, and table tennis. Grier's equestrian program hosts over 40 horses in facilities that include two indoor rings and two outdoor rings. Grier offers riding lessons at all levels of ability. Each student must participate in some sport at least one hour a day, four days a week.

Activities 
Grier girls and Kiski boys enjoy a dance together at an annual prom. On the weekends, there are many activities offered, both on campus and off.  Trips off-campus include visits to New York City to see Broadway shows, visits to museums in Pittsburgh and Washington, D.C., outing club activities, community service, horseback riding, skiing, shopping trips, bowling, trips to the movies, dinner outings, fly fishing, golfing and other activities.

Campus 
Grier students live in dormitories housed in the main complex of buildings and in dormitories called "Cottages." Two girls share one bedroom and a bathroom with the two students down the hall. A pair of housemothers supervise each dorm, taking care of the girls in the dorm. Grier kitchen staff provide breakfast, lunch, and dinner each day. School and college counselors help students adjust to life at school and prepare for college. There is a Health Center on campus, staffed by registered nurses.

Grier School also hosts summer camps during the summer months, a "sleep away" camp that also offers day camper programs. The summer camps attract students who enjoy horseback riding, dance, creative arts, and theater. At Grier summer camps, ages 7 to 18 may attend.

Notable alumnae
Camila Sodi

Sources 

Girls' schools in Pennsylvania
Educational institutions established in 1853
High schools in Central Pennsylvania
Private middle schools in Pennsylvania
Private high schools in Pennsylvania
Schools in Huntingdon County, Pennsylvania
1853 establishments in Pennsylvania